Fabian Doñate is an American politician in the Nevada Senate from Nevada's 10th district. He was appointed to the seat after incumbent Democrat Yvanna Cancela resigned to join the Biden Administration.

References

External links
 Profile at the Nevada Senate
 Campaign website

Democratic Party Nevada state senators
Hispanic and Latino American state legislators in Nevada
21st-century American politicians
Living people
Year of birth missing (living people)